Stephen Booth or Steve Booth may refer to:
Stephen Booth (academic) (1933–2020), American academic
Stephen Booth (writer) (born 1952), English crime-writer
Stephen Booth (cricketer) (born 1963), English cricketer

See also
Stefan Booth (born 1979), English actor and singer